Erich Schönbächler (6 September 1935 – 6 August 2022) was a Swiss biathlete. He competed in the 20 km individual event at the 1964 Winter Olympics.

References

External links
 

1935 births
2022 deaths
Swiss male biathletes
Olympic biathletes of Switzerland
Biathletes at the 1964 Winter Olympics
People from Einsiedeln
Sportspeople from the canton of Schwyz